Four Brass One Tenor is an album by Al Cohn's Jazz Workshop recorded in 1955 for the RCA Victor label.

Reception

The AllMusic review by Ken Dryden stated "Cohn is in terrific form, boosted by the swinging rhythm section" and called it a "very entertaining cool jazz album".

Track listing
All compositions by Al Cohn except as indicated
 "Rosetta" (Earl Hines, Henri Woode) - 4:25
 "The Song Is Ended" (Irving Berlin) - 2:42
 "Linger a While" (Harry Owens, Vincent Rose) - 3:22
 "Every Time" (Walter Kent, Walton Farrar) - 2:18
 "Haroosh" - 4:02
 "Just Plain Sam" (Manny Albam) - 2:55
 "I'm Coming Virginia" (Will Marion Cook, Donald Heywood) - 2:30
 "Cohn Not Cohen" - 2:46
 "A Little Song" - 2:47
 "Foggy Water" (Albam) - 2:49
 "Sugar Cohn" (Albam) - 3:07
 "Alone Together" (Arthur Schwartz, Howard Dietz) - 3:26
Recorded at Webster Hall in New York City on  May 9 (tracks 1, 4, 6 & 12), May 14 (tracks 2 & 8-11) and May 16 (tracks 3, 5 & 7), 1955

Personnel 
Al Cohn - tenor saxophone
Bernie Glow (track 2 & 8-11), Joe Newman, Joe Wilder (tracks 1, 4, 6 & 12), Phil Sunkel (tracks 3, 5 & 7), Thad Jones - trumpet
Nick Travis - trumpet, trombone
Dick Katz - piano
Freddie Green - guitar
Buddy Jones - bass
Osie Johnson - drums
 Al Cohn (tracks 1, 4, 5 & 7-11), Manny Albam (tracks 2, 3, 6 & 12) - arranger

References 

1955 albums
RCA Records albums
Al Cohn albums
Albums arranged by Manny Albam